Jane, Love is the debut EP by Chinese singer Jane Zhang, released on January 9, 2006 by Huayi Brothers.

Track listing 
 "Lights" (光芒) – 4:31
 "To Be Loved" – 4:31
 "Anti-Clockwise" (逆时针) – 3:49
 "Lights" (光芒) (Instrumental) – 4:31
 "To Be Loved" (Instrumental) – 4:31
 "Anti-Clockwise" (逆时针) (Instrumental) – 3:49

References 

2006 debut EPs
Mandopop EPs
Jane Zhang albums